Klattia is a genus of flowering plants in the family Iridaceae first described as a genus in 1877. The entire genus is endemic to Cape Province in South Africa. The genus name is a tribute to the German botanist Friedrich Wilhelm Klatt, who significantly advanced the body of knowledge of the family Iridaceae in the 19th century.

 Species
 Klattia flava (G.J.Lewis) Goldblatt - Grabouw
 Klattia partita Baker - southwestern Cape Province
 Klattia stokoei L.Guthrie - Kogelberg Mountains

References

Iridaceae genera
Endemic flora of South Africa
Iridaceae
Taxa named by John Gilbert Baker